The term gross substitutes is used in two slightly different meanings:
I.e., an increase in the price of one commodity causes people to want strictly more of the other commodity, since the commodities can substitute each other (bus and taxi are a common example).
 In auction theory and competitive equilibrium theory, a valuation function is said to have the gross substitutes (GS) property if for all pairs of commodities: . I.e., the definition includes both substitute goods and independent goods, and only rules out complementary goods. See Gross substitutes (indivisible items).

References 

Utility function types